The 1998–99 Tetley's Bitter Cup was the 28th edition of England's rugby union club competition. Wasps won the competition defeating Newcastle Falcons in the final. The event was sponsored by Tetley's Brewery and the final was held at Twickenham Stadium.

Draw and results

First round (19 September)

Second round (17 October)

Third round (14 November)

Fourth round (11 January)

Fifth round (30 January)

Quarter-finals (27 February)

Semi-finals (3 & 4 April)

Final

References

1998-99
1998–99 rugby union tournaments for clubs
1998–99 in English rugby union